The Hell-to-Finish Formation is a geologic formation in southwestern New Mexico. It preserves fossils dating back to the early Cretaceous period.

Description
The formation consists mostly of red to red-brown to gray or green shale, mudstone, and arkosic siltstone. The base of the formation is a well indurated conglomerate derived from the underlying Paleozoic beds. Minor arkose and limestone are present in the uppermost beds. The total thickness is up to  but varies considerably over the region. The formation rests on a profound unconformity with underlying Paleozoic formations in most locations, but overlies the Broken Jug Formation in the Little Hatchet Mountains. The Hell-to-Finish Foramtion is transitional to the overlying U-Bar Formation. The transitional contact with the Aptian U-Bar Formation suggests that the Hell-to-Finish Formation cannot be much older than Aptian.

The formation is interpreted as being deposited in an arid client, based on the nature of paleosols within the formation. Deposition took place in a west-northwest-trending rift basin.

Fossils
The upper beds of the formation contain abundant pelecypods. However, no age-diagnostic fossils have been found in the formation.

History of investigation
The formation was first defined by Zeller in 1965 for exposures near the Hell-to-Finish tank in the southern Big Hatchet Mountains of New Mexico.

See also

 List of fossiliferous stratigraphic units in New Mexico
 Paleontology in New Mexico

Footnotes

References
 
 
 
 
 
 
  

Cretaceous formations of New Mexico